Dalton Barracks is a military installation near Abingdon in Oxfordshire, England and home to No. 3 and 4 Logistic Regiments of the Royal Logistic Corps.

History
The barracks were established, on the site of the former RAF Abingdon airbase, in 1992: they were named after James Dalton VC, who earned his  VC as an acting assistant commissary in the Commissariat and Transport Department at the Battle of Rorke's Drift. The barracks were initially occupied by 3 and 4 Close Support Regiments of the Royal Corps of Transport (now 3 and 4 Regiments of the Royal Logistic Corps).

Based units 
The following units are based at Dalton Barracks.

 3 Regiment, Royal Logistic Corps
35 Headquarters Squadron  
21 General Support Squadron 
31 Close Support Squadron 
32 Close Support Squadron 
REME Light Aid Detachment (LAD).
 4 Regiment, Royal Logistic Corps
 75 Headquarters Squadron
 4 Close Support Squadron
 33 General Support Squadron
 60 Close Support Squadron
 REME Light Aid Detachment (LAD)

Future 
In March 2013 the Ministry of Defence announced that 12 Logistic Support Regiment would be disbanded with the loss of 400 jobs on the site. In November 2016 the Ministry announced that the site would close completely in 2029, this was later extended to 2030.

In 2021, it was reported that the site was being used to film Masters of the Air, an upcoming television series from Tom Hanks and Steven Spielberg.

References

Installations of the British Army
Barracks in England
Abingdon-on-Thames
Buildings and structures in Oxfordshire